The Innkeeper's Daughter is an 1817 stage melodrama by the British writer George Soane. It was loosely based on the ballad Mary the Maid of the Inn by Robert Southey. It premiered at the Theatre Royal, Drury Lane in London on 7 April 1817. The original cast included Henry Gattie as Frankland, James William Wallack as Richard, Thomas Cooke as Hans Ketzler, Frances Maria Kelly as Mary and Sarah Harlowe as Marian. The music was composed by Thomas Simpson Cooke. It's Irish debut was at the Crow Street Theatre in Dublin on 19 January 1818.

References

Bibliography
 Greene, John C. Theatre in Dublin, 1745-1820: A Calendar of Performances, Volume 6. Lexington Books, 2011.
 Nicoll, Allardyce. A History of Early Nineteenth Century Drama 1800-1850. Cambridge University Press, 1930.
 Raby, Peter. Fair Ophelia: A Life of Harriet Smithson Berlioz. Cambridge University Press, 2003.

1817 plays
West End plays
British plays
Plays by George Soane
Plays set in England